Tule Lake is an intermittent lake covering an area of ,  long and  across, in northeastern Siskiyou County and northwestern Modoc County in California, along the border with Oregon.

Geography
Tule Lake is fed by the Lost River.

It is one of twenty ancient lakes in the world that have existed continuously for more than 1 million years. However, this has recently come under significant threat due to multiple years of drought conditions. 

Wildlife and water
The lake is part of the Tule Lake National Wildlife Refuge and the Klamath Project. Deliveries of water from the Klamath Project have been necessary to provide sufficient water for wildlife. On July 24, 2020, a delivery of water from the Klamath Project saved 50,000 ducklings from death.

History

The Tule Lake War Relocation Center, a Japanese American internment camp, is located east of the lake, in Modoc County. During World War II, the United States federal government under Executive Order 9066, forced the evacuation of Japanese nationals and Japanese Americans, including citizens born in the United States, to numerous camps built in the interior of California and inland states. They were forced to sell their businesses and homes, and suffered enormous economic and psychological losses by being treated as potential enemies. Following World War II, the federal government awarded 86 farm sites on land reclaimed by the drainage of Tule Lake to returning white veterans using a land lottery. A lottery was used because the number of applicants was greater than the number of homesteads available.

See also
 Klamath Basin
 List of lakes in California

References

Ancient lakes
Lakes of Modoc County, California
Lakes of Siskiyou County, California
Klamath Mountains
Klamath River
Modoc Plateau
Lakes of Northern California
Lakes of California